Eloise in Moscow is the fourth of the Eloise series of children's books written by Kay Thompson and illustrated by Hilary Knight. Published during the height of the Cold War, it details the titular rich girl's experiences in the Soviet Union.

External links
 Eloise in Moscow Book Review
 Eloise in Moscow at InfoPlease.com

1959 children's books
Eloise (books)
Moscow in fiction